Velanidia (Greek: Βελανίδια) may refer to several villages in Greece:

Velanidia, Laconia, a village in Laconia
Velanidia, Messenia, a village in Messenia
Velanidia, Kozani, a village in the Kozani regional unit